The 1990 Manchester Open was an ATP men's tennis tournament held in Manchester, United Kingdom and played on outdoor grass courts. It was the inaugural edition of the tournament and was held from 18 to 25 June 1990. American Pete Sampras won his 2nd career title and his 2nd of the year by defeating Gilad Bloom in the final.

Finals

Singles

 Pete Sampras defeated  Gilad Bloom 7–6(11–9), 7–6(7–3)
 It was Sampras 2nd singles title of the year and of his career.

Doubles

 Mark Kratzmann /  Jason Stoltenberg defeated  Nick Brown /  Kelly Jones 6–3, 2–6, 6–4

References

External links
 ITF tournament edition details

 
Manchester Open
Manchester Open 
Manchester Open 
Manchster Open, 1990